This is a list of earthquakes in 1983. Only earthquakes of magnitude 6 or above are included, unless they result in damage and/or casualties, or are notable for some other reason. Events in remote areas will not be listed but included in statistics and maps. Countries are entered on the lists in order of their status in this particular year. All dates are listed according to UTC time. Maximum intensities are indicated on the Mercalli intensity scale and are sourced from United States Geological Survey (USGS) ShakeMap data.

By death toll

Listed are earthquakes with at least 10 dead.

By magnitude

Listed are earthquakes with at least 7.0 magnitude.

By month

January

February

March

April

May

June

July

August

September

October

References 

1983
1983 earthquakes
1983